Jean Gregoire Sagbo (born May 10, 1959) is a Beninese-born Russian real estate agent and politician. His position is councilor of Novozavidovo in Konakovsky District, Tver Oblast. Sagbo is the first Russian of African descent, or Afro-Russian, to have been elected to a local council in the Russian Federation. He has been referred to as "Russia's Obama".

Early life and career 
Sagbo was born on May 10, 1959, in Cotonou in the southern coastal region of the Republic of Dahomey. He immigrated to the USSR in 1982 to study economics in Moscow. He married a woman from Novozavidovo, a town of approximately 10,000 people located 100 km north of Moscow, and moved there in 1989. He has two children.  During his first year in Novozavidovo, Tver Oblast his then four-year-old son Maxim was spat upon. Sagbo completed his studies in 1984, after that, he went back to Benin but was arrested upon arrival because of his legal status in Russia as well as his political beliefs and he spent 3 years in detention but the Russians secured his release when they heard about the persecution. Sagbo confronted the spitter and eventually other onlookers supported Sagbo.  Racial attacks have taken place numerous times in Russia, 49 times in Moscow in one year according to an advocacy group.  Sagbo speaks in French-African accented Russian.

About 10 years prior to his first election, he organized a volunteer effort for an annual garbage collection day.  He also planted flowers and cleaned streets in front of his home without pay.

As a councilor, Sagbo collected donations to turn dilapidated lots between buildings into parks.  Sagbo was elected in 2010.  He has expressed annoyance at being referred to as "Russia's Obama" because the two are both merely black.  The position of councilor is unpaid.

Sagbo has been quoted as saying "Novozavidovo is dying...this is my home, my town. We can't live like this."  Vyacheslav Arakelov, the mayor of Novozavidovo said: "His skin is black but he is Russian inside...the way he cares about this place, only a Russian can care."

References

External links 
First Black Elected Official Defies Racism In Russia by NPR
 Article "Our Man from Benin" from Rossiyskaya Gazeta
Russia's first black elected official commands respect

1959 births
Living people
United Russia politicians
21st-century Russian politicians
Beninese emigrants to the Soviet Union
Naturalised citizens of Russia
Russian city councillors
People from Cotonou